The Contemporary A Cappella Society (of America), or CASA, is a 501(c)(3) charitable organization dedicated to fostering and promoting a cappella music of all styles around the world. CASA was founded in 1991 by Deke Sharon in San Francisco just after graduation. In his Tufts University dorm room during his senior year, Sharon published a newsletter, The "C.A.N." (The Collegiate A Cappella Newsletter for the first 2 issues, then The Contemporary A Cappella Newsletter), mailed to all known collegiate a cappella groups by merging "The List," founded in 1988 & distributed by Rex Solomon, with the database maintained by his college a cappella group the Beelzebubs. The organization boasts over 6,000 current members, and serves as a resource for media and scholarly work in the area of contemporary a cappella.



Awards

Contemporary A Cappella Recording Awards
Since 1992, the annual Contemporary A Cappella Recording Awards (aka the "CARAs") recognize the best recorded a cappella and aim to support this burgeoning culture of instrumentless enthusiasts. Every a cappella album produced each year is automatically considered in this celebration of the best a cappella recorded around the planet.

The CARA mission reflects that of its parent organization, the Contemporary A Cappella Society (CASA) : an aim to reward artists that create outstanding work and to promote innovation, creativity, and continued growth of the a cappella modality. Furthermore, the awards aim to foster the a cappella community by having its best and brightest participate in the CARA nomination and judging process. Finally, CASA uses the application process as a means to provide resources to charitable programs such as Tunes to Teens (free a cappella recordings for students).

A Cappella Community Awards
The "A Cappella Community Awards" (aka the "ACAs") are voted on annually by registered users of CASA.org to allow fans the chance to award their favorite a cappella groups. Often called the "People's Choice Awards of the A Cappella community", the ACAs aim to further award excellent groups and individuals in the a cappella community, including non-American groups, by giving fans a venue to reward their favorite groups.

Educational Programs 
CASA produces weekend-long educational festivals open to the general public several times a year around the US, including the Los Angeles A Cappella Festival ("LAAF") in February, the Boston A Cappella Festival ("BOSS") in April, and the Southern A Cappella Festival ("SoJam"). In the past festivals have been held in San Francisco, New York, Philadelphia, and Chicago.

CASAcademy
CASAcademy is a comprehensive web portal where CASA members can come to learn more about a cappella, hear samples of great music, view videos of great performances, read about forming and managing groups, and read about all a cappella-related topics (vocal health, etc.).

Acapedia 2.0
The CASA Acapedia is a huge database of a cappella groups, solo artists, beatboxers, studios, producers and more. The Acapedia is free and editable by any registered CASA member. It not only has information on existing groups, but also includes the profiles for groups that no longer exist. The database is set up like a Wiki, in which any user can add/modify information. All changes are tracked and can be un-done in the event of error or vandalism. The Acapedia currently features over 2400 profiles.

Each Acapedia profile is designed to include group information such as school or affiliation, current roster of members, concert listings, history, recording information, and tour dates.

Volunteer and Outreach Programs

Ambassador Program
The Ambassador Program is aimed to unite singers and groups from all over the country and world via an organized networking system. CASA Ambassadors are individuals responsible for being involved in their own a cappella communities- gathering information about groups, events, auditions, a cappella friendly clubs, singers, technology, opportunities and anything else that touches on a cappella. They upload that information to CASA.org via the Acapedia so it can be shared with the entire community.

Ambassadors also keep abreast of a cappella happenings globally via CASA.org, and share that information with their respective communities while encouraging them to become CASA members, to sing in Contemporary A Cappella League groups, to attend CASA festivals, and to support the vocal arts.

Ambassadors serve a one-year volunteer term, and are offered a number of incentives which have included free memberships to CASA.org, free copies of CASA-sponsored compilation albums and free tickets to CASA-sponsored festivals such as SoJam.

Tunes To Teens
Tunes To Teens (TTT) is designed to put a cappella CDs into the hands of developing singers. Chorus by chorus, TTT sends junior high and high school students a cappella CDs donated by a variety of sources. The program's goal is to spark interest in a cappella music in up-and-coming singers, and to serve as a touchstone for directors to teach their students the basics of music theory. Since 2003, over 2000 students in 23 US states and Canada have received CDs from TTT.

A Cappella Radio International was aired on over 50 stations worldwide from 1996 to 2004.

CASA has been establishing contemporary a cappella choruses around the United States, from the SF Bay Area to Maryland.

References

External links
Official Website
The New York Times Article Article from New York Time mentioning CASA.
Article about CASA Article about CASA on the Barbershop Harmony Society website
Allied Organizations Mention of CASA on the Barbershop Harmony Society website
American Music Teacher Article Article from American Music Teacher mentioning CASA
Boston Herald Article Article from Boston Herald about CASA's East Coast Summit
ACDA article Article from Eastern Division American Choir Director's Association Troubadour about CASA's East Coast Summit
CNN "A Cappella Summit Joins Voices in Harmony" and partial archive of text Vanderbilt Television News Archive  (scroll down)

Music organizations based in the United States
A cappella musical groups